The 1990 Bavarian state election was held on 14 October 1990 to elect the members of the 12th Landtag of Bavaria. It took place shortly after the formal reunification of Germany on 3 October. The Christian Social Union (CSU) led by Minister-President Max Streibl retained its majority. The Free Democratic Party (FDP) also re-entered the Landtag for the first time since 1982.

Parties
The table below lists parties represented in the 11th Landtag of Bavaria.

Election result

|-
! colspan="2" | Party
! Votes
! %
! +/-
! Seats 
! +/-
! Seats %
|-
| bgcolor=| 
| align=left | Christian Social Union (CSU)
| align=right| 6,093,514
| align=right| 54.9
| align=right| 0.9
| align=right| 127
| align=right| 1
| align=right| 62.3
|-
| bgcolor=| 
| align=left | Social Democratic Party (SPD)
| align=right| 2,882,008
| align=right| 26.0
| align=right| 1.5
| align=right| 58
| align=right| 3
| align=right| 28.4
|-
| bgcolor=| 
| align=left | The Greens (Grüne)
| align=right| 712,101
| align=right| 6.4
| align=right| 1.1
| align=right| 12
| align=right| 3
| align=right| 5.9
|-
| bgcolor=| 
| align=left | Free Democratic Party (FDP)
| align=right| 572,338
| align=right| 5.2
| align=right| 1.4
| align=right| 7
| align=right| 7
| align=right| 3.4
|-
! colspan=8|
|-
| bgcolor=| 
| align=left | The Republicans (REP)
| align=right| 538,615
| align=right| 4.9
| align=right| 1.9
| align=right| 0
| align=right| ±0
| align=right| 0
|-
| bgcolor=| 
| align=left | Ecological Democratic Party (ÖDP)
| align=right| 192,414
| align=right| 1.7
| align=right| 1.0
| align=right| 0
| align=right| ±0
| align=right| 0
|-
| 
| align=left | Others
| align=right| 106,922
| align=right| 1.0
| align=right| 
| align=right| 0
| align=right| ±0
| align=right| 0
|-
! align=right colspan=2| Total
! align=right| 11,098,912
! align=right| 100.0
! align=right| 
! align=right| 204
! align=right| ±0
! align=right| 
|-
! align=right colspan=2| Voter turnout
! align=right| 
! align=right| 65.9
! align=right| 4.2
! align=right| 
! align=right| 
! align=right| 
|}

Sources
 Bayerisches Landesamt für Statistik

Bavaria
1990
1990 in Bavaria
October 1990 events in Europe